Ashley Jade Bland Manlove (born April 28, 1986) is a Democratic member of the Missouri General Assembly, representing the State's 26th House district.

Career
Bland Manlove won the Democratic primary election on August 7, 2018, garnering 77% of the vote in a field of three candidates. She was elected unopposed on 6 November 2018.

Electoral History

Personal
Bland Manlove is a lesbian.

References

1986 births
21st-century American politicians
21st-century American women politicians
Living people
Bland Manlove, Ashley
Women state legislators in Missouri
LGBT state legislators in Missouri
Lesbian politicians
21st-century LGBT people